No. 293 Squadron was a Royal Air Force air-sea rescue squadron. During the Second World War the unit operated search and rescue missions for Allied aircraft operating over Italy.

History
No. 293 Squadron was formed at RAF Blida, North Africa on 28 November 1943 with the Vickers Warwick in the air-sea rescue role. After providing detachments into Italy the squadron moved to Pomigliano, Italy in March 1944. In April 1944 the Warwicks were supplemented by Supermarine Walrus flying boats. In March 1945 the squadron moved to Foggia, but moved back to Pomigliano in June where it stayed until it was disbanded on 5 April 1946.

Aircraft operated

Squadron bases

Commanding officers

See also
List of Royal Air Force aircraft squadrons

References

Notes

Bibliography

External links

 squadron histories nos. 291-295 sqn
 squadron history at MOD site

Military units and formations established in 1943
Aircraft squadrons of the Royal Air Force in World War II
293 Squadron
Military units and formations disestablished in 1946